Exaeretia kozhantshikovi is a moth in the family Depressariidae. It was described by Alexandr L. Lvovsky in 2013. It is found in central Russia (Krasnoyarsk).

References

Moths described in 2013
Exaeretia
Moths of Asia